Idiopathic guttate hypomelanosis is characterised by multiple small whitish flat spots. They are typically irregular, well defined and frequently appear on the arms, legs and face of older people.

It occurs in up to 80% of over 70-year olds. Females may notice them at a younger age than males.

See also
 List of cutaneous conditions
 Skin lesion

References

Disturbances of human pigmentation